Rodney S. Lyons Sr. (born December 1962) is a Democratic member of the Louisiana House of Representatives for District 87 in Jefferson Parish in suburban New Orleans, Louisiana. In January 2016, he succeeded Democrat Ebony Woodruff, whom he unseated in the primary election held on October 24, 2015. Lyons polled 2,883 votes (58.6 percent) to Woodruff's 2,034 (41.4 percent) in a low-turnout contest.

Lyons is a retired supervisor with the Jefferson Parish Streets Department. He formerly coached high school and youth league basketball. He is a former president of the Woodmere Civic Association, an organization of homeowners in the largest subdivision in Louisiana. Lyons calls himself "a quick study" who has "the pulse of the community at my fingertips."

References

1962 births
Living people
People from Harvey, Louisiana
Democratic Party members of the Louisiana House of Representatives
African-American state legislators in Louisiana
High school basketball coaches in the United States
21st-century American politicians
21st-century African-American politicians
20th-century African-American people